The Wagner Seahawks women's basketball team represents Wagner College in Staten Island, New York, United States. The school's team currently competes in the Northeast Conference.

History
Wagner began play in 1970.  They have won the Northeast Conference title just once, in 1989. That year, they went 22-7 (14-2 in conference play), winning both the regular season and the tournament (66-60 over Robert Morris). The Seahawks have never qualified for a postseason tournament, neither Division I nor WNIT nor WBI. As of the end of the 2015-16 season, the Seahawks have an all-time record of 511-665.

References

External links